The Barbados Gold Cup is a Barbadian Group I Thoroughbred horse race run annually in late February/early March since 1982 at the Garrison Savannah Racetrack in Bridgetown, Barbados. Contested over a turf course at a distance of 1,800 meters (8.95 furlongs), it is open to horses, age three or older.

The most important event on the Barbados horse racing calendar, it was inaugurated in 1982 with the intention of attracting the top horses from Caribbean countries. Since 1997 the race has been sponsored by the Sandy Lane Hotel.

In 1999, nineteen-year-old Attie S. Joseph III became the youngest owner to win the Gold Cup.

In 2007, Elizabeth Deane became the first female trainer to saddle a winner of the Barbados Gold Cup.

The race was not run in 2021 and 2022 due to the COVID-19 pandemic, but returned in March 2023. The 2023 edition was won by It's a Gamble, a son of English Channel, and jockey Jalon Samuel, who furthered his record wins to six.

Records
Speed  record: 
 1:48.40 - Sterwins (2010)

Most wins:
 3 - Sandford Prince (1989, 1991, 1992)
 3 - Blast of Storm (2000, 2001, 2002)
 2 - Dorsett (2016, 2017)

Most wins by an owner:
 8 - Sir David Seale (1986, 1989, 1991, 1992, 1993, 2012, 2013, 2020)

Most wins by a jockey:
 6 - Jalon Samuel (2012, 2016, 2017, 2018, 2020, 2023)
 4 - Venice Richards (1986, 1989, 1991, 1992)
 4 - Jono Jones (2000, 2001, 2002, 2003)
 4 - Patrick Husbands (1990, 2006, 2010, 2014)

Most wins by a trainer:
 7 - William C. Marshall (1984, 1994, 1995, 2000, 2001, 2002, 2003)

Winners of the Barbados Gold Cup

References

 The Barbados Gold Cup at the Barbados Turf Club website
 The Barbados Gold Cup at Pedigree Query

Recurring sporting events established in 1982
Horse races in Barbados
1982 establishments in Barbados